Vytautas Strolia (born 28 November 1992 in Anykščiai, Lithuania) is a Lithuanian cross-country skier and biathlete.

He competed at FIS Nordic World Ski Championships 2011 and FIS Nordic World Ski Championships 2013.

In 2014 Strolia was selected to represent Lithuania in 2014 Winter Olympic Games. After not reaching any outstanding results in Olympics Strolia moved to compete in biathlon. 

In 2015 Strolia competed in his first Biathlon World Cup stage where he finished 87th in sprint event. He also represented Lithuania in 2015 and 2016 World Championships.

Biathlon results
All results are sourced from the International Biathlon Union.

World Championships
0 medals

*During Olympic seasons competitions are only held for those events not included in the Olympic program.
**The single mixed relay was added as an event in 2019.

References

External links
 
 
 
 
 
 

1992 births
Living people
Lithuanian male cross-country skiers
Lithuanian male biathletes
Olympic cross-country skiers of Lithuania
Olympic biathletes of Lithuania
Cross-country skiers at the 2014 Winter Olympics
Biathletes at the 2018 Winter Olympics
Biathletes at the 2022 Winter Olympics
Sportspeople from Anykščiai